Ente Kadha is a 1983 Indian Malayalam-language film directed and produced by P. K. Joseph. The film stars Prem Nazir, Sukumari, Mammootty and Mohanlal in the lead roles. The film has musical score by A. T. Ummer.

Cast

Prem Nazir as Sreekumar and Shankar 
Sukumari as Babu's mother
Mammootty as Babu
Mohanlal as Ramesh 
Adoor Bhasi as head constable 
Ratheesh as Rajesh
Prathapachandran
Unnimary as Aparna 
Meena
Reena as Usha 
Vincent as Rich man in bar

Soundtrack
The music was composed by A. T. Ummer and the lyrics were written by Poovachal Khader and Dr. Pavithran.

References

External links
 

1983 films
1980s Malayalam-language films